Mycocalia is a genus of fungi in the family Agaricaceae. Their fruit bodies resemble tiny egg-filled birds' nests. Species are usually found growing on herbaceous stems and other plant debris. Thus genus was circumscribed in 1961 by mycologist J.T. Palmer with Mycocalia denudata as the type species.

Description
Species in this genus have small barrel- to lens-shaped fruit bodies, usually 0.5–2 mm broad, that grow by themselves in small groups. The peridium consists of loosely interwoven clamped hyphae. The peridioles, of which there may be one to several, are disc-shaped, yellow- to red-brown, and sit in a gelatinous matrix when young and fresh. Spores are elliptical in shape, smooth, hyaline and have dimensions of 5–9.5 by 3.5–7 µm.

See also
List of Agaricaceae genera
List of Agaricales genera

References

Agaricaceae
Agaricales genera